St. Michael Archangel's Church in Brunary is a Gothic, wooden church located in the village of Brunary from the eighteenth-century, which together with different tserkvas is designated as part of the UNESCO Wooden tserkvas of the Carpathian region in Poland and Ukraine.

History

The first tserkva in Brunary was raised in 1616, when a Uniate parish was founded in the village. A new tserkva was built in 1653, while the present in the eighteenth-century. In 1831, the tserkva was reconstructed and expanded. The old chancel was connected with the nave, adding a new nave, surrounded by three walls, with the whole tserkva covered with a new roof. After Operation Vistula, the tserkva was transformed into a Roman Catholic church.

References

World Heritage Sites in Poland
Gorlice County
Brunary
Wooden churches in Poland